Jean-Pierre Luminet (born 3 June 1951) is a French astrophysicist, specializing in black holes and cosmology. He is an emeritus research director at the CNRS (Centre national de la recherche scientifique). Luminet is a member of the Laboratoire d'Astrophysique de Marseille (LAM) and Laboratoire Univers et Théories (LUTH) of the Paris-Meudon Observatory, and is a visiting scientist at the Centre de Physique Théorique (CPT) in Marseilles. He is also a writer and poet.

Luminet has been awarded several prizes on account of his work in pure science and science communication, including the Georges Lemaître Prize (1999) in recognition of his work in cosmology. In November 2021, he received the UNESCO Kalinga Prize for the Popularization of Science. He serves on the editorial board of Inference: The International Review of Science.

The asteroid 5523 Luminet, discovered in 1991 at Palomar Observatory, was named after him.

Luminet has published fifteen science books, seven historical novels, TV documentaries, and six poetry collections. He is an artist, an engraver, a sculptor, and a musician. During his music career, he has collaborated with composers such as Gérard Grisey and Hèctor Parra. Some of Luminet's literary works have been translated into other languages, such as Chinese, Korean, Bengali, German, Lithuanian, Greek, Italian or Spanish.

Scientific career
After studying mathematics at the Saint-Charles University of Marseilles in 1976, Luminet moved to Paris-Meudon Observatory to undertake a Ph. D. with Brandon Carter as his advisor. He met Stephen Hawking at the Department of Applied Mathematics and Theoretical Physics in Cambridge, England. He defended his Ph.D. thesis in 1977 at Paris University on the subject of Singularities in Cosmology. In 1979, Luminet got a permanent research position at the CNRS and developed his scientific activities at Paris Observatory until 2014, before joining the Laboratoire d'Astrophysique de Marseille. During the two year interval, he was a visiting scientist at the University of São Paulo, Brazil (1984 and 1988), at the University of Berkeley, California (1989–1990) and a visiting astronomer at the European Southern Observatory, Chile (2005).

In 1979, Luminet created the first "image" of a black hole with an accretion disk, using nothing but an early computer, math, and India ink. He predicted that it could apply to the supermassive black hole in the core of the elliptical galaxy M87. In April 2019, the Event Horizon Telescope Consortium confirmed Luminet's predictions by providing the first telescopic image of the shadow of the M87* black hole and its accretion disk.

In 1982, along with physicist Brandon Carter, Luminet invented the concept of a Tidal disruption event (TDE), the destruction of a star passing in the vicinity of a supermassive black hole. They showed that this phenomenon could result in the violent destruction of the star causing a "stellar pancake" and nuclear reactions in the core of the star in the stage of its maximum compression. With other collaborators, Luminet predicted specific observational signatures and introduced the concept of "tidal supernovae". The theory of TDE was confirmed by observing eruptions resulting from the accretion of stellar debris. It explains the superluminous supernova SN 2015L, the tidal explosion of a white dwarf before being absorbed beneath a massive black hole.

In 1995, with his colleague , Luminet coined the term "Cosmic Topology" for describing the shape of space, proposing a variety of universe models compatible with the standard Friedmann-Lemaître models of relativistic cosmology.

In 2003, large scale anomalies in the anisotropies of the cosmic microwave background observed by the Wilkinson Microwave Anisotropy Probe led to Luminet suggesting that the shape of the universe is a finite dodecahedron, attached to itself by paired opposite faces, forming a Poincaré homology sphere. During the following years, astronomers searched for more evidence to support this hypothesis but found none.

Jean-Pierre Luminet is a specialist in the history of cosmology and in particular the emergence of the concept of the Big Bang. He emphasizes in several books and articles the leading role played by the Belgian priest and cosmologist Georges Lemaître. In 2018, the International Astronomical Union (IAU) recommended that Hubble's law be known as the Hubble-Lemaître law.

Luminet published a critical analysis of the Holographic principle and the AdS/CFT correspondence while working on Quantum gravity.

Artistic activities 

Luminet is devoted to drawing, engraving (learned with Jean Delpech at Ecole Polytechnique), and sculpture. A thorough analysis of his artwork has been done by Martin Kemp, Professor of Art History at Oxford University.

In the field of music, Luminet collaborated in 1991 with Gérard Grisey (a former pupil of Olivier Messiaen and Henri Dutilleux) to produce a piece of cosmic music called Le Noir de l'étoile (The Black of the Star). This work for six percussionists, based on magnetic tape and astronomical signals coming from pulsars, is regularly performed around the world. In 2011, he began a collaboration with Hèctor Parra, who composed the orchestral piece Caressant l'horizon (Caressing the Horizon) inspired by Luminet's books. In 2017, Luminet wrote the scenario for Parra's Inscape. Composed of an ensemble of 16 soloists, large orchestra, and electronics, the piece describes an Utopian voyage through a giant black hole. It was created in 2018 in Barcelona, Paris, and Köln.

In 1998, Luminet was a curator of the exhibition Figures du Ciel (Figures of Heaven), coupled to the opening of the new Bibliothèque nationale de France. (October 1998 – January 1999)

Honors and recognition 
Luminet has received more than twenty prizes and honors, including:
 1999 – Georges Lemaître Prize in recognition of his work in cosmology
 1999 – The asteroid 5523 Luminet was named after him.
 2002 – Grand Prize at the 7th researcher's film festival for his audiovisual work
 2006 – Prix Paul Doistau-Émile Blutet of French Academy of Sciences for Science Popularization
 2007 – European Prize for Science Communication
 2008 – International G.B. Lacchini Prize from Italian Astroamateurs Union
 2021 – UNESCO Kalinga Prize for the Popularization of Science.

Selected publications

Science books (in French) 

 1987 Les Trous Noirs
 1994 La Physique et l'infini with Marc Lachièze-Rey
 1998 Figures du Ciel with Marc Lachièze-Rey
 1999 Eclipses, les rendez-vous célestes with Serge Brunier
 2002 Le Feu du ciel : météores et astéroïdes tueurs
 2004 L'invention du Big Bang
 2005 L'Univers chiffonné
 2005 De l'infini with Marc Lachièze-Rey
 2006 Le destin de l'univers : Trous noirs et énergie sombre
 2009 Bonnes nouvelles des étoiles with Élisa Brune
 2011 Illuminations
 2012 Astéroïdes : la Terre en danger
 2015 L'univers en 100 questions
 2016 Dialogues sous le ciel étoilé with H. Reeves
 2016 De l'infini – horizons cosmiques, multivers et vide quantique (augmented edition) with M. Lachièze-Rey
 2019 Chroniques de l'espace
 2020 : L'écume de l'espace-temps

 Science books (in English) 

 1992 Black Holes (revised edition), Cambridge University Press
 2001 Glorious Eclipses (with Serge Brunier), Cambridge University Press
 2001 Celestial Treasury (with M. Lachièze-Rey), Cambridge University Press
 2008 The Wraparound Universe, New York, AK Peters

 Novels and poetry (in French) 

 1993 Noir soleil
 1996 Les poètes et l'Univers, Éditions le cherche-midi
 1999 Le Rendez-vous de Vénus
 2004 Itinéraire céleste
 2002 Le Bâton d'Euclide
 2006 Les bâtisseurs du ciel, Tome 1, Le secret de Copernic
 2008 Les bâtisseurs du ciel, Tome 2, La discorde céleste: Kepler et le trésor de Tycho Brahé
 2009 Les bâtisseurs du ciel, Tome 3, L'œil de Galilée
 2010 Les bâtisseurs du ciel, Tome 4, La Perruque de Newton
 2012 La Nature des choses, Éditions le cherche-midi
 2014 Un trou énorme dans le ciel, Éditions Bruno Doucey
 2015 Ulugh Beg, L'astronome de Samarcande, Éditions Jean-Claude Lattès

 See also 

 Physical cosmology
 List of cosmologists
 Non-standard cosmology
 Timeline of cosmology

References

Sources
 
 
 

Further readinng
 J.-P. Luminet & B. Carter, "Dynamics of an Affine Star Model in a Black Hole Tidal Field", Astrophys. J. Suppl. 61, 219–248 (1986)
J.-P. Luminet et al., "Dodecahedral space topology as an explanation for weak wide-angle temperature correlations in the cosmic microwave background", 2003.
J.-P. Luminet : "Interstellar Science", Inference : International Review of Science, vol. 1, no. 2 (March 2015)
J.-P. Luminet : "Cosmic Topology", Scholarpedia, 10(8):31544 (2015)
J.-P. Luminet : "The Holographic Universe", Inference'' (2)1, (2016)
J.-P. Luminet : "An Illustrated History of Black Hole Imaging : Personal Recollections (1972–2002)", (2019)

External links
Jean-Pierre Luminet Personal page at LUTH
Luminesciences, Jean-Pierre Luminet blog in English on Futura-Sciences
The youtube channel of J.-P. Luminet with more than 300 videos of conferences and interviews.

Bringing Black Holes down to Earth, in European Science Awards 2007
Getting to know Jean-Pierre Luminet in European Science and Technology, issue 10 (2011)
Inference: The International Review of Science

20th-century French astronomers
French astrophysicists
20th-century French physicists
21st-century French physicists
21st-century French astronomers
French National Centre for Scientific Research scientists
1951 births
Living people
Kalinga Prize recipients
Research directors of the French National Centre for Scientific Research